Francis Price may refer to:
Francis Price (planter) (1635–1689), English planter in Jamaica
Francis Wilson Price (1895–1974), missionary of the Presbyterian Church